7 días al desnudo (English:7 días exposed) was a Spanish TV sitcom which aired in Cuatro between 2005 and 2006. It was developed by Videomedia and directed by Jesús Font. It aired 11 episodes between 2005 and 2006.

Plot
A married couple of journalists, Marta (María Botto) and Miguel (Javier Veiga) have different concepts of their profession, she likes information and he sensationalism but they live a happy life until the news magazine "7 días", hires Miguel as director instead of Marta, and he decides to make the magazine more frivolous.

Cast
  (Miguel Cimadevilla)
  (Andrés Buenaventura)
 María Botto (Marta Castillo)
 Laura Pamplona (Julia Bartolomé)
 Juan Fernández (Gus Marina)
 Rosa Boladeras (Inés)
 David Bages (Santi)
 Patricia Conde (Sonsoles)
  (Roxana)

References

2005 Spanish television series debuts
2006 Spanish television series endings
Spanish television sitcoms
Television series about journalism
Cuatro (TV channel) original programming